Dr. D. Nageshwara Reddy is an Indian gastroenterologist who studied at the Kurnool Medical College. He is the chairman and founder of Asian Institute of Gastroenterology (AIG) at Hyderabad, the biggest gastroenterology hospital in the world. He received the Padma Shri award in 2002 and Padma Bhushan award in 2016.

An elected fellow of the National Academy of Medical Sciences, he was given the world's highest gastroenterology award in Shanghai, China, at a function held in September, 2013. He was conferred with the Rudolf V. Schindler Award, the highest category in the prestigious Crystal Awards named after Schindler, who is considered as “the father of gastroscopy” by American Society of Gastrointestinal Endoscopy (ASGE)

Awards 

The American Society of Gastrointestinal Endoscopy (ASGE) awarded Reddy the Master Endoscopist Award in 2009. This is the highest award in the field of endoscopy in the world and is also termed as the "Nobel Prize of Endoscopy".in the world.

He was awarded the Padma Bhushan by the Government of India in 2016.

In 2002 he was awarded by Padma Shri, which is one of the Highest Civilian awards given by the Government of India.

References 

Living people
Year of birth missing (living people)
Indian gastroenterologists
Recipients of the Padma Shri in medicine
Fellows of the National Academy of Medical Sciences
People from Kurnool district
Medical doctors from Andhra Pradesh
Recipients of the Padma Bhushan in medicine
20th-century Indian medical doctors